The discography of British-Irish girl group Girls Aloud consists of five studio albums, two greatest hits albums, two live albums, and one remix album. The band has also released twenty-one singles and have provided eleven original recordings for other albums.

Girls Aloud was formed in 2002 on the ITV1 talent show Popstars: The Rivals. Viewers voted for Cheryl Tweedy, Nicola Roberts, Nadine Coyle, Kimberley Walsh and Sarah Harding to be members of the group. The following month they won the program by claiming the coveted Christmas Number One, ahead of the male group One True Voice. They released their debut single "Sound of the Underground", which became the Christmas number-one on both the UK Singles Chart and Irish Singles Chart. Their second single, "No Good Advice", was released in both CD and DVD single formats in May 2003. A week later, the group released their debut album Sound of the Underground, which was certified platinum by the British Phonographic Industry (BPI). The third single to be taken from the album was "Life Got Cold". Their fourth single, "Jump", a cover version of "Jump (for My Love)" by The Pointer Sisters, was taken from the soundtrack for the film Love Actually, and appeared on the re-issue of Sound of the Underground.

What Will the Neighbours Say?, the group's second album, was released in November 2004 and produced four singles, "The Show", "Love Machine", "I'll Stand by You", and "Wake Me Up". Preceded by the singles "Long Hot Summer" and "Biology", their third album, Chemistry, was released in December 2005. It is their lowest charting album to date, although it was still certified platinum in the UK. The following year, Girls Aloud released their greatest hits anthology, The Sound of Girls Aloud, which included their twelve singles and three new songs, two of which, "Something Kinda Ooooh" and "I Think We're Alone Now", were released as singles. March 2007 saw the release of "Walk This Way", a charity single for Comic Relief, performed in collaboration with Sugababes.

In November 2007, the album Tangled Up was released and entered the UK Albums chart at number four. It was preceded by the lead single "Sexy! No No No...". The group's nineteenth single, "The Promise", was released in October 2008, and entered the UK and Irish Singles Charts at numbers one and two respectively. It was taken from Out of Control, their fifth studio album, which was released on 31 October 2008 in Ireland and 2 November in the UK. "The Loving Kind" was released on 12 January 2009 in the UK and peaked at number ten in the UK, becoming their 20th consecutive top-10 single, while "Untouchable" reached number 11, making it their first single to miss the UK top 10. In 2012, the group's second greatest hits album Ten was released and entered the UK Albums Chart at number nine. The album yielded two singles, "Something New" and "Beautiful 'Cause You Love Me", which were both released in 2012.

Girls Aloud have sold over 4.3 million singles and 4 million albums in the United Kingdom alone.

In the United States, their combined digital song sales stand at 79,000, while their first four albums have sold 8,000.

Albums

Studio albums

Compilation albums

Live albums

Remix album

Box sets

Video albums

Singles

Promotional singles

Other appearances
These songs have not appeared on any release by Girls Aloud.

Music videos

See also
List of awards and nominations received by Girls Aloud
List of Girls Aloud concert tours
List of Girls Aloud songs
List of best-selling girl groups

References

External links
 Official website
 
 

Discography
Discographies of British artists
Pop music group discographies